"The Shotgun Boogie" is a 1950 song by Tennessee Ernie Ford.  "The Shotgun Boogie" was Tennessee Ernie Ford's most successful release on the Country & Western charts, staying on the charts for a total of twenty-five weeks, and at number one for fourteen weeks.  Ford, a hunter himself, wrote the song.

References
 

 
 

1950 songs
Tennessee Ernie Ford songs
Song articles with missing songwriters